The 2006 Letran Knights men's basketball team represented Colegio de San Juan de Letran in the 82nd season of the National Collegiate Athletic Association in the Philippines. The men's basketball tournament for the school year 2006-07 began on June 24, 2006, and the host school for the season was De La Salle–College of Saint Benilde.

The Knights, the Season 81 champions, finished the double round-robin eliminations at third place with 10 wins against 4 losses. They were eliminated by PCU Dolphins in the Final Four.

Roster 

 Depth chart Depth chart

NCAA Season 82 games results 

Elimination games were played in a double round-robin format. All games were aired on Studio 23.

Source: NCAA.org.ph

Awards

Players drafted to the PBA

References 

2006–07 in Philippine college basketball
Letran Knights basketball team seasons